Marco Fincato (born 6 October 1970 in Padua) is a former Italian professional cyclist. He participated in 3 Tours de France and 2 Giro d'Italia.

Major results

1995
1st GP Industria e Commercio di San Vendemiano
1st Giro della Regione Friuli Venezia Giulia
5th  Cycling World Championships Amateur Men's Road Race
1996
1st Firenze–Pistoia
1st Memorial Nencini
2nd Giro del Lazio
2nd Subida a Urkiola
3rd Volta a Catalunya
5th Clásica de San Sebastián
5th Tour de France stage 11
1998
3rd Giro del Lazio
1999
5th GP de Fourmies
2000
1st Tour de Suisse stage 7
4th Tour de Suisse stage 3

References

1970 births
Living people
Italian male cyclists
Sportspeople from Padua
Cyclists from the Province of Padua
Tour de Suisse stage winners